Sherni is a 1988 Indian Hindi-language action drama film directed by Harmesh Malhotra. The film stars Sridevi in the lead role, while Shatrughan Sinha, Pran, Ranjeet, Kader Khan, Tej Sapru in the supporting roles. The music is composed by Kalyanji-Anandji.

The film marked the second collaboration between Sridevi and Harmesh Malhotra following the 1986  Nagina.

Cast 
Sridevi as Durga
Shatrughan Sinha as Inspector Rajan
Pran as Durga's Father
Ranjeet as Vinodpal Singh
Kader Khan as Thakur Dharampal Singh
Ram Mohan as Durga's Gang-member
Sudhir as Inspector S. K. Sinha
Tej Sapru as Teja 
Jagdeep as Hajamat Lal
Birbal as Constable Baburam

Soundtrack

References

External links

1988 films
Indian action films
1980s Hindi-language films
Films scored by Kalyanji Anandji
Films directed by Harmesh Malhotra
1988 action films
Hindi-language action films